Déclic Images is a French company specialised in the translation and sale of Japanese-style comics in the French-speaking world.

The Déclic Images trademark was born in 1999. As early as 2002, the company produced nearly half of all new Japanese anime published in France. The newly published series are often rich in episodes and their release dates come in quick succession.

The main goal of the company is to offer popular series that are accessible to all, containing at least 26 episodes. In order to ensure good sales, Déclic Images decided to produce both recent titles (Love Hina, Fruits Basket, etc.) and anime classics such as Heidi or Masters of the Universe.

A commercial war began in 2002 against Kaze animation and Dybex, Déclic Images' competitors in the anime market. This was despite the fact that both of the companies' products were distributed by Déclic Images' parent company, Manga Distribution. In order to guarantee its preeminence in the market, Déclic Images decided to offer Japanese copyright holders unprecedented licence-acquisition offers. Other publishers had the choice between offering equally interesting prices, falling back on less prestigious titles or hoping to find undiscovered talent.

At the height of Japanese anime sales in 2005, Déclic Images's sales reached 5.24 million euro. It sold its products in supermarkets, over the Internet and in specialised shops, and in 2004 launched a large marketing campaign that included TV ads. Despite this presence on the market, Déclic Images was in need of a coup, as each product generated only a small profit and Manga Distribution handled its supermarket presence badly. In 2005 everything changed for the young company.

After solid growth between 2002 and 2005, with a dozen titles being released per year, the company released Goldorak in August 2005. It was later revealed that Déclic Images did not hold the rights to the title. After extensive judicial travails, a French appeals court confirmed in 2009 a judgment of 4.8 million euro in damages against the company. Several matters remain in the courts, including the matter of a 2006 release of Captain Future without proper licensing rights.

Déclic Images has since gone through a number of restructurings and recovery proceedings, and currently seems to be in the impossibility of finding new licensing opportunities, nowadays only relying on re-releases of their current library of titles, having lost the confidence of Japanese distributors and producers, leaving sequels and remakes of anime series that they have licensed (such as Full Metal Panic!: The Second Raid and Last Exile: Fam, the Silver Wing) unlicensed. Their last license before they stopped licensing anime titles was Gakuen Alice. Black Lagoon, Black Lagoon: The Second Barrage, and X were relicensed by Kazé in 2012, and the company also licensed Black Lagoon: Roberta's Blood Trail. Full Metal Panic! and Full Metal Panic? Fumoffu were relicensed by Dybex in 2014, and the company also licensed Full Metal Panic!: The Second Raid''.

Anime
Over the years Déclic Images has distributed a number of popular anime series, movies, and OVAs in their network. Déclic Images would either distribute the series through TV or at times become the publisher of the series in France.   
Ai Yori Aoshi (TV) : Distributor
Ai Yori Aoshi ~Enishi~ (TV) : Distributor
Alps no Shōjo Heidi (TV) : Distributor
Astro Boy [1980] (TV) : Distributor
Attacker You! (TV) : Distributor
Baki the Grappler (TV) : Distributor
Basilisk (TV) : Distributor
Black Lagoon (TV, seasons 1-2) : Distributor (relicensed by Kazé in 2012)
Blue Gender (TV) : Distributor
Blue Gender: The Warrior (movie) : Distributor
Blue Seed (TV) : Distributor
Blue Seed Beyond (OAV) : Distributor
Captain Future (TV) : Distributor
Chrono Crusade (TV) : Distributor
City Hunter: Death of the Vicious Criminal Ryo Saeba (special) : Distributor
Cybersix (TV) : Distributor
D.N.Angel (TV) : Distributor
Dagger of Kamui (movie) : Distributor
DT Eightron (TV) : Distributor
El Hazard: The Alternative World (TV) : Distributor
El Hazard: The Wanderers (TV) : Distributor
Flame of Recca (TV) : Distributor
Fruits Basket (TV) : Distributor
Full Metal Panic! (TV) : Distributor (relicensed by Dybex in 2014)
Full Metal Panic? Fumoffu (TV) : Distributor (relicensed by Dybex in 2014)
Gad Guard (TV) : Distributor
Galaxy Express 999 Movie : Distributor
Gankutsuou: The Count of Monte Cristo: Distributor
Gatchaman '94 (OAV) : Distributor
Glass no Kamen (TV) : Distributor
Gravion (TV) : Distributor
Gravion Zwei (TV) : Distributor
Gunparade March (TV) : Distributor
Heat Guy J (TV) : Distributor
Hikari no Densetsu (TV) : Distributor
Hikaru no Go (TV) : Distributor
Infinite Ryvius (TV) : Distributor
Izumo: Takeki Tsurugi no Senki (TV) : Distributor
JoJo's Bizarre Adventure (OAV) : Distributor
Kagaku Ninja-Tai Gatchaman (TV) : Distributor
Kaleido Star (TV) : Distributor
Kerokko Demetan (TV) : Distributor
Kiddy Grade (TV) : Distributor
Kimagure Orange Road (TV) : Distributor
Kurenai Sanshiro (TV) : Distributor
Lady!! (TV) : Distributor
Last Exile (TV) : Distributor
Lost Universe (TV) : Distributor
Love Hina (TV) : Distributor
Love Hina Again (OAV) : Distributor
Love Hina Spring Special - I wish Your Dream : Distributor
Love Hina X'mas Special - Silent Eve : Distributor
Magical Shopping Arcade Abenobashi (TV) : Distributor
Maho no Star Magical Emi (TV) : Distributor
Mahou no Tenshi Creamy Mami (TV) : Distributor
Meiken Jolie (TV) : Distributor
Monster Rancher (TV) : Distributor
Nanaka 6/17 (TV) : Distributor
NieA 7 (TV) : Distributor
Nightwalker: The Midnight Detective (TV) : Distributor
Now and Then, Here and There (TV) : Distributor
Outlanders (OAV) : Distributor
Ozu no Mahōtsukai (TV) : Distributor
Peacemaker (TV) : Distributor
Princess Nine (TV) : Distributor
Princess Tutu (TV) : Distributor
R.O.D -The TV- : Distributor
Ranma ½ (TV) : Distributor
Ring ni Kakero (TV) : Distributor
Robotech (U.S. TV) : Distributor
Rune Soldier (TV) : Distributor
SaiKano (TV) : Publisher
Saiyuki (TV) : Distributor
Saiyuki Gunlock (TV) : Distributor
Saiyuki Reload (TV) : Distributor
Sasurai no Shōjo Nell (TV) : Distributor
Scrapped Princess (TV) : Distributor
Seven of Seven (TV) : Distributor
Shaman King (TV) : Editor
Shingu: Secret of the Stellar Wars (TV) : Distributor
Silent Möbius (TV) : Broadcaster
Slayers (TV) : Distributor
Slayers - The Motion Picture : Distributor
Slayers Excellent (OAV) : Distributor
Slayers Gorgeous (movie) : Distributor
Slayers Great (movie) : Distributor
Slayers Next (TV) : Distributor
Slayers Premium (movie) : Distributor
Slayers Return (movie) : Distributor
Slayers Special (OAV) : Distributor
Slayers Try (TV) : Distributor
Sonic X (TV) : Editor
Soul Hunter (TV) : Distributor
Space Adventure Cobra (TV) : Distributor
Space Adventure Cobra: The Movie : Distributor
Speed Grapher (TV) : Distributor
Tanoshii Moomin Ikka (TV) : Distributor
The Galaxy Railways (TV) : Distributor
The Irresponsible Captain Tylor (TV) : Distributor
Thundercats (U.S. TV) : Distributor
UFO Robo Grendizer (TV) : Distributor
Urusei Yatsura (TV) : Distributor
X (TV) : Distributor (relicensed by Kazé in 2012)

References

External links
 
 Official site, in French.

Television networks in France
Anime companies